The ascending pharyngeal artery is an artery in the neck that supplies the pharynx, developing from the proximal part of the embryonic second aortic arch.

It is the smallest branch of the external carotid and is a long, slender vessel, deeply seated in the neck, beneath the other branches of the external carotid and under the stylopharyngeus muscle. It lies just superior to the bifurcation of the common carotid arteries.

The artery most typically bifurcates into embryologically distinct pharyngeal and neuromeningeal trunks.  The pharyngeal trunk usually consists of several branches which supply the middle and inferior pharyngeal constrictor muscles and the stylopharyngeus, ramifying in their substance and in the mucous membranes lining them.  These branches are in hemodynamic equilibrium with contributors from the internal maxillary artery.  The neuromeningeal trunk classically consists of jugular and hypoglossal divisions, which enter the jugular and hypoglossal foramina to supply regional meningeal and neural structures, being in equilibrium with branches of the vertebral, occipital, posterior meningeal, middle meningeal, and internal carotid arteries (via its caroticotympanic branch, meningohypophyseal, and inferolateral trunks).  Also present is the inferior tympanic branch, which ascends towards the middle ear cavity; it is involved in internal carotid artery reconstitution via the "aberrant carotid artery" variant.  The muscular branch of the ascending pharyngeal artery is in equilibrium with the odontoid arcade from the vertebral artery.

Ascending pharyngeal artery has 2 Branches:- Inferior tympanic artery & Posterior meningeal artery

Course
It arises from the back part of the external carotid, near the commencement of that vessel, and ascends vertically between the internal carotid and the side of the pharynx, to the under surface of the base of the skull, lying on the longus capitis.

References

External links
 http://neuroangio.org/anatomy-and-variants/ascending-pharyngeal-artery/

Arteries of the head and neck
Pharynx